James Stuart (born 24 September 1988), is an Australian former professional rugby league footballer who played in the 2000s and 2010s.

Playing career
Stuart made his National Rugby League (NRL) debut for the Canberra Raiders in round 2 of the 2010 season against the Brisbane Broncos.

Stuart played his junior football for the South Tuggeranong Knights. He had also represented Queensland City and Queensland Residents in 2009.

References

Australian rugby league players
1988 births
Living people
Canberra Raiders players
Rugby league wingers
Souths Logan Magpies players
Rugby league centres
Burleigh Bears players
Rugby league fullbacks
Place of birth missing (living people)